Conseil Hill is a hill midway along the north shore of Pourquoi Pas Island. It was mapped by the Falkland Islands Dependencies Survey from surveys and air photos, 1946–59, and named by the UK Antarctic Place-Names Committee after a character in Jules Verne's Twenty Thousand Leagues Under the Sea.

References
 

Hills of Graham Land
Fallières Coast